Zábiedovo is a village and municipality in Tvrdošín District in the Žilina Region of northern Slovakia.

History
In historical records the village was first mentioned in 1567.

Geography
The municipality lies at an elevation of 670 metres and covers an area of 17.974 km². It has a population of about 790 people.

External links
https://web.archive.org/web/20070513023228/http://www.statistics.sk/mosmis/eng/run.html

Villages and municipalities in Tvrdošín District